Michigan Boy Boat is the third commercial mixtape by American rapper Lil Yachty. It was released on April 23, 2021, through Capitol Records, Motown Records, and Quality Control. The mixtape features guest appearances from Tee Grizzley, Veeze, Baby Smoove, Louie Ray, Swae Lee, RMC Mike, Icewear Vezzo, Rio Da Yung OG, Babyface Ray, Sada Baby, BabyTron, KrispyLife Kidd, Slap Savage, and YN Jay. The production is handled by Helluva, Enrgy Beats, Sav, Buddah Bless, Carlo, Reuel StopPlaying, 30 Roc, Toju, and BSM Productions.

Background
The mixtape is named after the state Michigan in the United States, with Lil Yachty describing it as a tribute for his "second home". Speaking on his collaborations with artists from Michigan in an interview with Eric Skelton of Complex on April 22, 2021, in which he thought about them as rapping "about all kinds of crazy shit" and described them as "mad fucking lyrical in a weird way" because "the schemes and the cadences and the flows are so unorthodox".

Release and promotion
Lil Yachty released a song called "Cortex" as a trailer for the mixtape on April 19, 2021. He then revealed the title, cover art, and release date on April 21, 2021, tagging the featured artists on Instagram. The songs "Royal Rumble" and "Not Regular", respectively featuring KrispyLife Kidd, RMC Mike, Babyface Ray, Rio Da Yung OG, Icewear Vezzo, and Sada Baby, were released on October 20, 2020.

Critical reception

Michigan Boy Boat was met with generally favorable reviews. At Metacritic, which assigns a normalized rating out of 100 to reviews from professional publications, the mixtape received an average score of 63, based on six reviews. Aggregator AnyDecentMusic? gave it 5.7 out of 10, based on their assessment of the critical consensus.

Robin Murray of Clash praised the album, stating, "It's difficult to see Michigan Boy Boat winning over the doubts – sure, it's definite progression, but it feels more like a reinforcement of core values than an attempt to reach out". Alphonse Pierre of Pitchfork said, "For anyone searching for an entry point, it's a fun introduction to the fast-paced instrumentals, unpredictable flows, and demented punchlines synyonmous with Detroit and Flint". In a lukewarm review, AllMusic's Neil Z. Yeung wrote, "The set employs the unique, off-beat flow preferred by the Michigan underground, which Yachty adopts well enough on tracks like "Concrete Goonies" and "Final Form". In a mixed review, NMEs Kyann-Sian Williams stated: "Although the off-counter flow can get monotonous at times – unfortunately making a number of the tracks on Michigan Boy Boat rather skippable – Yachty's embrace of the Michigan scene here come across as a daring way of reinventing his once-bubbly rap aesthetic."

Danny Schwartz of Rolling Stone said, "Yachty is a great ambassador for Michigan rap, but as Michigan Boy Boat illustrates, he's far from the best practitioner of the style. He is the protagonist of the mixtape, but he isn't its anchor". Antoine-Samuel Mauffette Alavo of Exclaim! said, "The mixtape format may excuse the lack of sonic cohesion for the project, but it does not explain the faltering artistic direction that is more than likely to leave Yachty's fans disoriented and disenchanted".

Track listing

Personnel
Credits adapted from Tidal.

 Thomas Mann – mixing, studio personnel (all tracks)
 Colin Leonard – mastering, studio personnel (all tracks)
 Gentuar Memishi – recording, studio personnel (all tracks)
 Helluva – programming (tracks 1, 2)
 Enrgy Beats – programming (tracks 3, 14)
 Sav – programming (tracks 4, 6, 9, 11)
 Buddah Bless – programming (track 5)
 Carlo – programming (tracks 7, 10)
 Reul StopPlaying – programming (track 8)
 30 Roc – programming (track 12)
 Toju – programming (track 12)
 BSM Productions – programming (track 13)

Charts

References

2021 mixtape albums
Lil Yachty albums